is a railway station on the Iida Line in the town of Minowa, Kamiina District, Nagano Prefecture, Japan, operated by Central Japan Railway Company (JR Central).

Lines
Sawa Station is served by the Iida Line and is 189.7 kilometers from the starting point of the line at Toyohashi Station.

Station layout
The station consists of one ground-level side platform serving a single bi-directional track. There is no station building, but only a shelter built on top of the platform. The station is unattended.

Adjacent stations

History
Sawa Station opened on 16 March 1923. With the privatization of Japanese National Railways (JNR) on 1 April 1987, the station came under the control of JR Central. The current station building was completed in 1996.

Passenger statistics
In fiscal 2016, the station was used by an average of 344 passengers daily (boarding passengers only).

Surrounding area
Minowa Kita Elementary School

See also
 List of railway stations in Japan

References

External links

 Sawa Station information 

Railway stations in Nagano Prefecture
Railway stations in Japan opened in 1923
Stations of Central Japan Railway Company
Iida Line
Minowa, Nagano